Danville station, also known as Danville Southern Railway Passenger Depot, is a historic train station in Danville, Virginia. It is currently served by Amtrak, the United States' national passenger rail service, and is a stop on the Crescent line.

History 
The station was built in 1899 from plans drawn by the noted Southern Railway architect, Frank Pierce Milburn. In 1915, a track expansion required that the track be moved 133 feet to the northeast. The station was jacked up on rollers, and crews used mules and stump pullers to roll the building. It is said that the move was done so skillfully that not a single brick was cracked.

In 1922, the building was almost destroyed by fire that broke out during a raging snowstorm, which prevented firefighting teams from reaching it. Southern Railway rebuilt the building to its original specifications, except for the spire that once topped the station. With the decline of passenger use of railroads, the building fell into disuse. For years it was closed and Amtrak passengers had to walk through a tunnel and wait for trains on an open platform between the tracks.

In 1993 the station was closed to passenger service temporarily and bought by the City of Danville. In 1995, the station was listed on the National Register of Historic Places. The same year, a group of local civic leaders sought federal ISTEA funding and local contributions to renovate the station. In addition to serving Amtrak passengers, part of the station is now used as a campus of the Danville Science Center. This is the first satellite facility of the Science Museum of Virginia, coincidentally also a former train station. The station is also used for the Danville Farmer's Market.

References

External links 

Danville Amtrak Station (USA RailGuide -- TrainWeb)

Amtrak stations in Virginia
Transportation in Danville, Virginia
Railway stations in the United States opened in 1899
Stations along Southern Railway lines in the United States
Frank Pierce Milburn buildings
Railway stations on the National Register of Historic Places in Virginia
Renaissance Revival architecture in Virginia
Buildings and structures in Danville, Virginia
National Register of Historic Places in Danville, Virginia
Individually listed contributing properties to historic districts on the National Register in Virginia